The Heping River is a river in Taiwan.

Geology
The river spans over a length of 50.7 km with maximum discharge level 7.900 m3/s.

See also
 List of rivers of Taiwan

References

Rivers of Taiwan